Coleophora femorella is a moth of the family Coleophoridae. It is found on Corsica.

The larvae possibly feed on the generative organs of Genista corsica.

References

femorella
Moths described in 1898
Moths of Europe